Route nationale 22  (RN22) is a primary highway in Madagascar. The route runs from the capital city of Fenoarivo Atsinanana (Fénérive) to Anjahambe, a city on the eastern coast of the Madagascar.

Selected locations on route (from east to west)
 Fenoarivo Atsinanana (Fénérive)  (junction with RN 5)
 Vavatenina -  mostly paved, 38 km
 Anjahambe

See also 
 List of roads in Madagascar 
 Transport in Madagascar

References 

Roads in Madagascar
 Roads in Analanjirofo